Winter Kills is a 1979 satirical black comedy thriller film written and directed by William Richert, based on the 1974 novel of the same name by Richard Condon. A fiction inspired by the assassination conspiracy of President John F. Kennedy, its all-star cast includes Jeff Bridges, John Huston, Anthony Perkins, Eli Wallach, Richard Boone, Toshirō Mifune, Sterling Hayden, Dorothy Malone, Belinda Bauer, Ralph Meeker, Elizabeth Taylor, Berry Berenson and Susan Walden.

The film simplifies the plot of the book somewhat, emphasizing humor. It follows the events surrounding the assassination of the fictional President Kegan (patterned after John F. Kennedy). Several years later, Kegan's half-brother Nick (Bridges) discovers leads which suggest there may have been a plot to kill the President.

Winter Kills was a box office bomb, and received mixed reviews from critics. It has, however, developed a cult following.

Plot 
On February 22, 1960, President of the United States Timothy Kegan is shot and killed by a sniper during a visit to Philadelphia, Pennsylvania. A subsequent federal investigation named the sole perpetrator to be a lone gunman named Willie Arnold, who is murdered by nightclub owner Joe Diamond before he can stand trial.

Nineteen years later, Nick Kegan, half-brother of Timothy and heir to the wealthy Kegan dynasty, is on his father's oil tanker when a helicopter lands carrying Keifetz, a family associate, and a heavily-bandaged man named Arthur Fletcher. Carried into sick bay, Fletcher tells an orderly that in 1960 he and another gunman were hired by a man named Casper Jr. to assassinate President Kegan, with Arnold set up as a patsy. Fletcher claims to have stashed the rifle used in the assassination in room 903 of the Engleson Building in Philadelphia. Before Nick can question him any further, Fletcher dies of his injuries.

Nick, accompanied by his friend Miles Gardner and Police Captain Heller, travels to Philadelphia; uncovering the rifle from its hiding place. As the three are leaving, a young woman on a bicycle passes by and seconds later an unseen sniper shoots and kills Nick's companions. In a panic, Nick rushes to a payphone and tries to call his father, but is instead connected to his chief accountant John Cerruti. When Nick reports the incident and his whereabouts, Cerruti promises to send help, but the rifle is stolen by an unseen person as Nick waits.

Nick travels to his father Pa's California desert estate, only to be promptly rebuked for leaving the tanker. When Nick reports Fletcher's confession and the incident in Philadelphia, Pa initially storms off, but later resolves to help Nick expose the assassination conspiracy. Nick learns that Captain Heller has been dead for over two years, the one killed in Philadelphia was an imposter.

Pa sends Nick to meet his former political rival and one of the wealthiest men in the U.S., Z.K. Dawson. Threatening Nick with a tank, Dawson maintains his innocence, but implicates the real Heller and his right-hand man Lt. Roy Doty. Pa calls Nick to tell him that Keifetz and the orderly that recorded Fletcher's confession have both died under mysterious circumstances.

Nick meets Doty, who remembers that the man implicated in Fletcher's confession, Casper, Jr., was connected to the Philadelphia police through Joe Diamond. According to Doty, Diamond bribed Captain Heller for access into the police station so he could kill Willie Arnold after the presidential assassination. Gangster Gameboy Baker arranged the assassination because the president did not return favors for the mafia's $2 million campaign contribution and Arnold was their scapegoat. Diamond died in prison four years after the killing of Arnold.

Nick asks his girlfriend Yvette Malone to help him track down information about Joe Diamond through her employer, National Magazine. She directs him to a Cleveland, Ohio diner, where he meets gangster Irving Mentor and bribes him for information. Mentor reports that Casper, Jr., figured in the assassination because he was connected to a Hollywood studio that lost $50 million when one of their stars killed herself over an affair with the President. Just then, the same woman on the bicycle who appeared before the shootings in Philadelphia brings a dead cat into Mentor's diner and Nick chases after her as the restaurant explodes from a bomb, the woman escaping.

Nick returns to New York, where Pa debunks Mentor's story and orders Nick to meet with imprisoned gangster Frank Mayo, who was given special leave for the interview. When Mayo suggests that Nick is being misled, Nick heads to National Magazine headquarters and learns that Yvette is not actually an employee. Later, the hostile doorman at Yvette's apartment insists that she does not live there.

Returning home, Nick finds Keifetz, who admits that he faked his death and encourages Nick to use Cerruti's intelligence connections to find Yvette. At Pa's financial headquarters, Cerrutti tells Nick that Yvette was kidnapped by Casper Jr., and recounts a new version of the assassination. According to Cerruti, a Washington, D.C. madam named Lola Comante, who obliged the president's fondness for sex, offered him a $2 million campaign contribution from Mayo and his mafia associates. When the president discovered that Pa was behind the deal, he ended their relationship, leaving Pa financially and emotionally devastated.

Changing the story yet again, Cerruti confesses that he arranged for Nick to meet a fraudulent Z.K. Dawson in Tulsa. The real Dawson and his daughter, Yvette, were the true perpetrators of the assassination; Yvette, formerly known as Maggie Dawson, was the president's mistress. Nick discounts Cerruti's story and insists on learning Yvette's whereabouts. As Nick assaults and fractures Cerruti's arms with a baton, he breaks down. Cerutti claims that Pa spent millions of dollars to support his son's presidency because it benefited him financially, but he was displeased by the president's liberal politics and so it was Pa who had him killed. Pa created an elaborate hoax to confuse Nick, including the employment of an actress named Jenny O'Brien to play the role of Yvette. When Cerruti says that Jenny is "tied up" at Kegan Medical School, Nick leaves to find her body in the morgue.

Sometime later, Nick confronts his father in his office, but Pa claims that Cerruti masterminded the assassination to augment the Kegan coffers and blackmailed Pa into keeping quiet. When Nick attempts to call the police, Keifetz and an officer break into Pa's office and Nick thinks the men are there to back him up; however, Pa announces that Keifetz is an assassin with orders to kill Nick. Defending himself, Nick grabs the officer and uses his gun to fire at Keifetz, who shoots back at the officer as he dies. Nick chases his father onto the high-rise balcony and finds Pa clinging to the rail of an enormous American flag. As Nick reaches for his father, Pa falls to his death, tearing the flag in half with his body as he calls out to Nick: "put my money in South America!". Nick staggers away, but tells the secretary that he will return because he cannot escape his family ties. Leaving the Kegan building, he has one final encounter with the woman on the bicycle, who waves at him but rides away uneventfully.

Sometime later, Nick calls Yvette's answering machine to hear her voice one last time.

Cast

 Jeff Bridges as Nick Kegan
 John Huston as Pa Kegan
 Anthony Perkins as John Cerruti
 Eli Wallach as Joe Diamond
 Sterling Hayden as Z.K. Dawson
 Dorothy Malone as Emma Kegan
 Tomas Milian as Frank Mayo
 Belinda Bauer as Yvette Malone / Jenny O'Brien
 Toshiro Mifune as Keith
 Ralph Meeker as "Gameboy" Baker
 Richard Boone as Keifitz
 David Spielberg as Miles Garner
 Brad Dexter as Captain Walt Heller One
 Michael Thoma as Ray Doty
 Ed Madsen as Captain Walt Heller Two
 Irving Selbst as Irving Mentor

Screenwriter and John Huston collaborator Gladys Hill played Rosemary, while character actor Joe Spinell appeared as Arthur Fletcher, and singer/songwriter Lissette Álvarez portrayed Soledad. Other small appearances include Byron Morrow as the Secretary of State, Tisa Farrow as a nurse, Gianni Russo as an airline pilot, Kim O'Brien as a blonde girl, and Erin Gray as a "beautiful woman". John Warner played the ill-fated Timothy Kegan, and Elizabeth Taylor makes an uncredited cameo as Lola Comante.

Production 
The film’s original producers were wealthy marijuana dealers Robert Sterling and Leonard Goldberg, who had previously worked on releasing the French softcore Emmanuelle films in the U.S. Many of the film's interior scenes were shot in 1977 at the Greystone Mansion in Beverly Hills, then home to the American Film Institute's film school. The production’s financing was erratic, with it quickly going over budget. The cast and crew reported that they began receiving their pay by being called to a hotel room where they were given envelopes of well-used bills; eventually even that source dried up, and people agreed to continue working on the project for free until union officials heard of this arrangement and shut down the production, forcing it to declare bankruptcy. Goldberg was murdered (most likely by the Mafia) in the middle of production, for failure to pay his debts, and Sterling was later sentenced to 40 years in prison for marijuana smuggling.

Richert and Winter Kills stars Bridges and Bauer went to Germany and filmed a comedy called The American Success Company (released in 1980), whose distribution rights made enough money for Richert to fund a resumption of Winter Kills two years later. Director of photography Vilmos Zsigmond had moved on to other projects, and was replaced by John Bailey. All the same, the film's distributor, Embassy Pictures controlled the final cut.

A few years later, Richert acquired the rights to the film and re-released a director's cut, with a new ending, in 1983.

The film was the last acting appearance for Candice Rialson.

Reception 
The film holds a score of 89% on review aggregator Rotten Tomatoes based on 18 reviews, with a rating average of 7.1 out of 10. Many reviewers pointed out that the film existed on the boundary of a comedy and a thriller.

Janet Maslin of The New York Times compared the film to M*A*S*H and Dr. Strangelove, writing, "'Winter Kills' isn't exactly a comedy, but it's funny. And it isn't exactly serious, but it takes on the serious business of the Kennedy assassination." The Times''' Vincent Canby also praised the film, complimenting writer/director William Richert's imagination. On the other hand, Variety magazine wrote of the film, "If there’s a decent film lurking somewhere in Winter Kills, writer-director William Richert doesn’t want anyone to see it in his Byzantine version of a presidential assassination conspiracy." Gene Siskel of the Chicago Tribune gave the film 1 star out of 4 and wrote, "'Winter Kills' rapes the memory of President John F. Kennedy while giving his late father a few dozen kicks in the head, too ... It revels in its every degrading scene. One feels a little less clean just having seen this picture." Charles Champlin of the Los Angeles Times called it "the kind of conspiratorial caper you like for its continual surprises or hate for its escalating confusions ... It is a Gee Whiz item, expansive, impersonal, never dull." Gary Arnold of The Washington Post called it an "extravagantly kitschy" film with a "fairly repulsive" story. Brendan Gill of The New Yorker saw the film twice and reported that "I enjoyed it even more the second time, but I cannot pretend that I understood it any better. It is like some intricately embroidered misadventure recounted by a superb, somewhat tipsy storyteller late at night in the library of a big country house, with the cold rain of an enemy night lashing against the windows, and a cozy ruin of red fire red upon the hearth." David Ansen of Newsweek wrote, "In keeping with a morality tale on the excesses of wealth and power, it is extravagantly confusing, grandiosely paranoid, flamboyantly absurd and more than a little fun. Though it utterly lacks the internal consistency that 'good' movies require, as a wild-goose chase it maintains a certain lunatic fascination."

The film was a box office failure, making barely over $1 million on a $6.5 million budget. Distributor Embassy Pictures pulled the film from theaters soon after it was released; Condon and Richert hypothesized that Embassy killed it deliberately in order to avoid threatening legal defense contracts elsewhere within the conglomerate.

The 1983 re-release (and distribution to video) included scenes not originally shown on screen, including the original ending, and with additional footage of Elizabeth Taylor.

 Documentary Who Killed 'Winter Kills'?'' is a 2003, 38-minute documentary film, directed by Perry Martin and distributed by Anchor Bay, about the production of the film.

References

External links 
 
 
 

1979 films
1979 comedy films
1979 directorial debut films
1970s black comedy films
1970s comedy thriller films
1970s mystery films
1970s satirical films
1970s thriller films
American black comedy films
American business films
American comedy thriller films
American mystery films
American political thriller films
American thriller films
Embassy Pictures films
1970s English-language films
Films about assassinations
Films about conspiracy theories
Films about security and surveillance
Films based on American novels
Films directed by William Richert
Films scored by Maurice Jarre
Films set in California
Films set in Cleveland
Films set in New York City
Films set in Philadelphia
Films shot in California
Films shot in New York City
Films shot in Philadelphia
Films à clef
1970s American films